Events in the year 1955 in Belgium.

Incumbents
Monarch – Baudouin
Prime Minister – Achille Van Acker

Events

 9 February – Joint letter from the Belgian bishops calling on the government to revise its education policy.
 26 March – Mass demonstration in Brussels against Socialist–Liberal education bill.
 3 April – International friendly between the Dutch and Belgian national football teams in the Olympic Stadium, Amsterdam.
 6 May – Paris Protocol transforming the Brussels Pact into the Western European Union comes into effect.
 16 May – King Baudouin arrives in Belgian Congo for a royal tour of the colony.
 13 June – Education bill passes in lower house.
 10 July – Over a quarter of a million demonstrate in Brussels against Socialist–Liberal education policy.
 21 July – Education bill passes in senate.
 5 November – Convention establishing the Interparliamentary Consultative Council of the Benelux.

Publications

Comics
 Edgar P. Jacobs, Le Mystère de la Grande Pyramide, Tome 2 (the fifth comic book in the Blake and Mortimer series)

Art and architecture
Paintings
 René Magritte, The Mysteries of the Horizon 

Films
 André Cauvin (dir.), Bwana Kitoko
 Ytzen Brusse (dir.), Introducing Belgium [The Atlantic Community Series].

Births
 16 January – Martin De Prycker, engineer
 16 March – Linda Lepomme, singer
 26 April – Frieda Van Themsche, politician
 24 May – Philippe Lafontaine, singer
 8 June – Philippe Vlerick, businessman
 3 July – Maria Herrijgers, cyclist
 6 July – Johan Vande Lanotte, politician
 9 July – Alexandra Colen, politician
 24 July – Joseph Reynaerts, singer (died 2020)
 5 August – Daniel Ost, gardener
 18 August – André Flahaut, politician
 27 August – Kristien Hemmerechts, writer
 29 August – Frank Hoste, cyclist
 10 September – Jean-Pierre Vande Velde, footballer
 2 October – Michel Wintacq, footballer
 13 October – Patrick Dewael, politician
 18 October – Jean-Pierre Hautier, television presenter (died 2012)
 21 October – Frank Vandenbroucke, politician
 3 November – Michel Renquin, footballer
 27 November – Alain De Roo, cyclist
 4 December – Jean-Philippe Vandenbrande, cyclist
 6 December – Piet Vanthemsche, veterinary surgeon
 18 December – André Geerts, comics creator (died 2010)

Deaths
 24 January – Charles Deruyter (born 1890), cyclist
 13 February – Raoul Henkart (born 1907), fencer
 19 February – Marcel Dubois (born 1886), wrestler
 21 February – Emmanuel Janssen (born 1879), industrialist
 8 March – Princess Clémentine of Belgium (born 1872)
 21 March – Octave Dierckx (born 1882), politician
 16 April – Robert, 7th Duke d'Ursel (born 1873), politician
 7 June – Alfred Bastien (born 1873), war artist
 5 July – Gustave Magnel (born 1889), engineer
 3 August – Fernand Faniard (born 1894), opera singer
 9 August – Henri Verhavert (born 1874), gymnast 
 3 September – Léon Halkin (born 1872), historian
 16 October – Charles Cambier (born 1884), footballer
 19 October – Eugène Joseph Delporte (born 1882), astronomer
 13 November – Jacques Feyerick (born 1874), athlete
 22 December – Jules-Émile Verschaffelt (born 1870), physicist

References

 
1950s in Belgium
Belgium
Years of the 20th century in Belgium
Belgium